Vunukuru or Unukuru is a village panchayat in Regidi Amadalavalasa mandal of Srikakulam district in Andhra Pradesh, India.

Assembly Constituency 
Vunukuru was an assembly constituency in Andhra Pradesh until 2008.

List of Elected Members:
1978 - Babu Parankusam Mudili, Janata Party
1983 - Kimidi Kala Venkata Rao, Telugu Desam Party
1985 - Kimidi Kala Venkata Rao, Telugu Desam Party
1989 - Kimidi Kala Venkata Rao, Telugu Desam Party
1994 - Palavalasa Rajasekharam, Indian National Congress
1999 - Kimidi Ganapathi Rao, Telugu Desam Party
2004 - Kimidi Kala Venkata Rao, Telugu Desam Party

References 

Villages in Srikakulam district